WakeMed Soccer Park is a major soccer complex in Cary, North Carolina, United States. It consists of a purpose-built, soccer-specific main stadium called Sahlen's Stadium at WakeMed Soccer Park, two lighted practice fields, and four additional fields. Sahlen's Stadium and the two lighted fields (2 & 3) are all FIFA international regulation size. Sahlen's Stadium seats 10,000, while Field 2 also has 1,000 permanent bleacher seats. The complex also sports a full-length, nationally recognized cross-country course and houses the offices of Triangle Professional Soccer.

Originally opened in 2002 as the home of the Carolina Courage of the WUSA, WakeMed Soccer Park is now the home to North Carolina FC of the United Soccer League and the North Carolina Courage of the National Women's Soccer League. The North Carolina State Wolfpack men's and women's teams of the ACC play select matches there and the complex regularly hosts major tournaments such as the NCAA College Cup, the ACC Soccer Championships, and the NCHSAA high school state soccer finals.

SAS Institute, a Cary-based software company, had naming rights to the complex through June 30, 2007, with the option to extend their naming rights for an additional three years. On September 27, 2007, the Town of Cary announced that SAS had not exercised their option on the naming rights and that WakeMed Health & Hospitals had purchased the naming rights to the complex for $300,000 per year. Effective January 1, 2008, the complex became known as WakeMed Soccer Park. On March 31, 2017, it was announced that Sahlen Packing Company had acquired naming rights to the main stadium at WakeMed Soccer Park, thus becoming Sahlen's Stadium at WakeMed Soccer Park. Sahlen's will pay $400,000 over 5 years for the rights, with $100,000 going to the town of Cary and the rest to the North Carolina Courage.

Construction history

WakeMed Soccer Park opened in May 2002 as State Capital Soccer Park. The park is on  that the state of North Carolina has leased to Wake County. Money to build the soccer park came from $14.5 million in county-wide hotel room and prepared food and beverage taxes. The Town of Cary assumed responsibility for operations and maintenance in 2004 from Capital Area Soccer League. On January 26, 2006, the Town of Cary council amended its lease to allow it to sublet the property to Triangle Professional Soccer through the year 2011 for the exclusive promotion of professional soccer and lacrosse events at the complex.

2011 expansion
In November 2011, the Town of Cary kicked off a $6.3 million expansion project. The finished expansion added 3,000 permanent seats to the 7,000-seat stadium, 1,500 of the seats going to the north end zone and the other 1,500 to upper-level stands on the east side of the stadium. Also added on the east side were a new three-story building to provide restrooms, concessions, and access to the additional seating from the third floor. Team locker rooms were relocated to the ground level of the new structure to allow players direct access to the stadium from midfield and direct access from their team bus to the locker rooms.

Notable events
 2002 United States men's national soccer team World Cup Training Camp
 2002 Women's Nike Cup 1st Round
 2003 WUSA All-Star Game
 2003 NCAA Women's College Cup
 2003 ACC Soccer Championships
 2004 ACC Soccer Championships
 2004 NCAA Women's College Cup
 2005 ACC Soccer Championships
 2005 NCAA Men's College Cup
 2006 Rochester Rhinos Spring Combine and Training Camp
 2006 United States men's national soccer team v. Jamaica
 2006 United States men's national soccer team World Cup Training Camp
 2006 USL First Division All-Star Game (v. Sheffield Wednesday)
 2006 United States women's national soccer team v. Canada
 2006 State Games of North Carolina (soccer events, ceremonies)
 2006 ACC Women's Soccer Championships
 2006 NCAA Women's College Cup
 2007 El Salvador v. Honduras International Friendly
 2007 ACC Men's Soccer Championships
 2007 NCAA Men's College Cup
 2008 NCAA Women's College Cup
 2008 Major League Lacrosse Rochester Rattlers vs. Philadelphia Barrage
 2009 NCAA Men's College Cup
 2009 Panama vs. Honduras International Friendly
 2010 ACC Women's Soccer Championships
 2010 ACC Men's Soccer Championships
 2010 NCAA Women's College Cup
 2011 United States women's national soccer team v. Japan
 2011 United States men's national soccer team Training Camp
 2013 NCAA Women's College Cup
 2014 United States women's national soccer team v. Switzerland
 2014 NCAA Men's College Cup
 2015 NACRA Sevens Regional Olympic Qualifier
 2015 Raleigh Flyers (AUDL) Southern Division Playoffs
 2016 Carolina RailHawks v. West Ham United
 2017 North Carolina FC v. Atlas CF
 2017 North Carolina FC v. Swansea City
 2017 United States women's national soccer team v. South Korea
 2018 United States men's national soccer team v. Paraguay
 2018 CONCACAF Women's Championship Group A
 2018 NCAA Women's College Cup
 2019 North Carolina FC v. Club Necaxa
 2019 Women's International Champions Cup
 2019 NWSL Championship
 2019 NCAA Men's College Cup (Georgetown University)
 2020 NCAA Men's College Cup (Marshall v. Indiana)

Cross-country events 
The grounds also host multiple high school cross-country races. Including dual meets, high school conference championships, Mid-East Region Championship, and the Nike Team Southeast National Regional meets. The course starts and ends behind the practice fields and runs along the perimeter of the grounds. It is known to give personal bests even with a difficult hill which must be run twice. The course record for the 5k distance is 14:32.2 by Brodey Hasty at the 2016 Great American Cross Country Festival. In recent years it has held the Atlantic Coast Conference's conference championship.

This is the course map: https://web.archive.org/web/20110708121330/http://www.carolinaday.com/meets/2008/2008-nxn-reg-se-course-map.jpg

References

External links

Stadium info at Town of Cary.org
Live Field Closure/Status Information
Pictures tagged with sassoccerpark at Flickr
Travel Guide for Fans Visiting WakeMed Soccer Park

Sports venues completed in 2002
Buildings and structures in Cary, North Carolina
North Carolina FC
North Carolina Courage
NC State Wolfpack sports venues
NC State Wolfpack men's soccer
Rugby union stadiums in the United States
Former Major League Lacrosse venues
Soccer venues in North Carolina
Sports in Raleigh-Durham
Tourist attractions in Wake County, North Carolina
2002 establishments in North Carolina
North American Soccer League stadiums
National Premier Soccer League stadiums
Ultimate (sport) venues
Sports complexes in the United States
National Women's Soccer League stadiums